Frederick William Brearey (1816–1896) was a British aeronautical inventor. He cofounded the Aeronautical Society of Great Britain and was its secretary for thirty years.

Brearey cofounded the Aeronautical Society of Great Britain with five others in 1866. Brearey was Honorary Secretary society from then until his death thirty years later.

Brearey made a "wave action" aeroplane model driven by a rubber band. It had rigid spars (elsewhere called "bowsprits") which beat up and down, trailing undulating wings of fabric behind them, whose action propelled the model forward with "limited success." 
He filed for patents on this craft in Britain in 1879 and later in the U.S.

Brearey published more than 15 articles about aeronautical subjects from 1866 to 1883.

The 1880 and 1885 patents identify Brearey's location as Blackheath, Kent.

References 

Aviation pioneers
1816 births
1896 deaths